Eugene (Gene) Jarosewich (1926–2007) was a chemist in the Department of Mineral Sciences at the Smithsonian Institution.  Gene was known worldwide for his wet chemical analyses of meteorites. Working with specimens from the National Mineral Collection, Gene and his co-workers also developed a set of commonly used standards for electron microprobe analyses.

The mineral Jarosewichite and asteroid 4320 Jarosewich are named in his honor.

External links 
 Chemical Analyses of Meteorites Article

References 

20th-century American chemists
1926 births
2007 deaths